Elections to local bodies (Panchayats, Municipalities and Corporations) in Kerala were held in December 2020. The polling was held in three stages; on 8, 10 and 14 December, with the votes counted and results announced on 16 December.

The Left Democratic Front (LDF), who also forms the state government, won in more than half of all gram panchayats, two-thirds of district panchayats and in four out of six municipal corporations. The United Democratic Front (UDF), led by Indian National Congress (INC), improved its vote share nearly by 0.7%, compared to that in the previous 2015 election. Despite that, they were able to win just three out of fourteen district panchayats and one corporation, in comparison to seven and two respectively in the previous election. The National Democratic Alliance (NDA), led by Bharatiya Janata Party (BJP), increased their tally of wards won and secured a majority in two municipalities and nineteen panchayats.

Background 
Kerala Panchayat Raj Act, 1994 made provisions for the creation of local bodies at the village, block and district levels. The Kerala Municipalities Act, 1994 made provisions for the creation of municipalities and corporations.

In total, Kerala has 1200 local self-governing bodies – 941 gram panchayats, 14 district panchayats, 152 block panchayats, 87 municipalities and 6 corporations.

COVID-19 pandemic 
An all-party meeting decided to file a plea in the state high court to defer the polls, which was set for November 2020, considering the increasing COVID cases.

An ordinance by the Governor of the state, which temporarily amended Kerala Panchayat Raj Act, 1994, allows COVID-19 quarantined patients to vote via postal ballots and increases the voting time by two hours.

Parties and coalitions
The Left Democratic Front (LDF) is the coalition of left wing and far-left parties, led by the Communist Party of India (Marxist) (CPI(M)). The United Democratic Front (UDF) is a coalition consisting chiefly of centrist and centre-left parties led by the Indian National Congress. The National Democratic Alliance (NDA) is led by the right-wing Bharatiya Janata Party.

Chellanam 20/20, a newly formed civic forum, contests in the elections to all 21 wards in Chellanam. Twenty20 Kizhakkambalam, a party formed by a corporate firm which had contested in the panchayat for the 2015 elections has fielded candidates in five panchayats. V4 Kochi, an apolitical organisation had 74 candidates contesting in all wards of Kochi Corporation. Kerala Janapaksham (Secular), led by Poonjar MLA P. C. George, contests independently in four district panchayats, four block panchayats and two gram panchayats in Kottayam district. Thiruvananthapuram Vikasana Munnettam an apolitical organisation contested in 14 wards of Thiruvananthapuram Corporation.

Previous composition

Local body wise

Ward-wise

Campaign 
The president of the Kerala unit of BJP K. Surendran claimed that the incumbent LDF government would face a setback in the election due to the 2020 Kerala gold smuggling case, in relation to which the Chief Minister Pinarayi Vijayan's then principal secretary was arrested by Enforcement Directorate. The opposition UDF faced several infightings, one among which alliance partner Kerala Congress (M) underwent a split with the faction led by Jose K. Mani joining LDF. BJP faced factionalism between some of its top leaders and the state president.

Voters and polls 
Voters list for the election was published on 17 June. The final list was published on 1 October with a supplemental list published on 10 November.

As the term of the current members of local bodies end on November 11, three-member administrative committees would be formed and take over administration in each local body, in accordance with Kerala Panchayat Raj Act, 1994, and the Kerala Municipality Act, 1994.

Kerala High Court dismissed petitions which alleged that reservation of local body constituencies continued for a third successive term citing that the court would not interfere in elections.

1.68 lakh candidates filed nominations to various local bodies, which was dwindled down to 74,899 candidates after the rest were either rejected or withdrawn. In total there are 34,744 polling booths; 29,321 in panchayats, 3,422 in municipalities and 2,001 in corporations.

Phase I: Thiruvananthapuram, Kollam, Pathanamthitta, Alappuzha and Idukki districts

Phase II: Ernakulam, Kottayam, Thrissur, Palakkad and Wayanad districts

Phase III: Malappuram, Kozhikode, Kannur and Kasaragod districts

Result

Popular votes 
All of the three major pre-poll alliances in the state increased their vote share compared to that in the previous election.

|- style="background-color:#E9E9E9; text-align:center;"
! class="unsortable" |
! colspan="2"|Alliance
! Political party !! Votes !! Vote % !! ±pp 
|-
|colspan=7 bgcolor=""|
|-
|rowspan=12 bgcolor=""|
!rowspan=12|LDF

! style="text-align:left;" |Left Democratic Front
!8,450,430
!40.18%
!2.82%
|-

| style="text-align:left;" |Communist Party of India (Marxist)
|5,628,188
|26.71%
|
|-

| style="text-align:left;" |Communist Party of India
|1,459,396
|6.93%
|
|-

| style="text-align:left;" |Kerala Congress (M)
|534,759
|2.54%
|
|-

| style="text-align:left;" |Loktantrik Janata Dal
|293,814
|1.40%
|1.40%
|-

| style="text-align:left;" |Janata Dal (Secular)
|175,613
|0.83%
|
|-

| style="text-align:left;" |Indian National League
|139,016
|0.66%
|
|-

| style="text-align:left;" |Nationalist Congress Party
|132,933
|0.63%
|
|-

| style="text-align:left;" |Congress (Secular)
|45,215
|0.21%
|
|-

| style="text-align:left;" |Kerala Congress (B)
|39,140
|0.19%
|
|-

| style="text-align:left;" |Janadhipathya Kerala Congress
|1,612
|0.01%
|0.01%
|-

| style="text-align:left;" |Kerala Congress (Skaria Thomas)
|744
|0.00%
|
|-
|colspan=7 bgcolor=""|
|-
|rowspan=9 bgcolor=""|
!rowspan=9|UDF

! style="text-align:left;" |United Democratic Front
!7,988,255
!37.92%
!0.69%
|-

| style="text-align:left;" |Indian National Congress
|5,327,605
|25.29%
|
|-

| style="text-align:left;" |Indian Union Muslim League
|1,909,729
|9.06%
|
|-

| style="text-align:left;" |Kerala Congress (Joseph)
|419,049
|1.99%
|1.99% 
|-

| style="text-align:left;" |Revolutionary Socialist Party
|171,483
|0.82%
|
|-

| style="text-align:left;" |Communist Marxist Party (John)
|80,304
|0.38%
|
|-

| style="text-align:left;" |Kerala Congress (Jacob)
|48,448
|0.23%
|
|-

| style="text-align:left;" |All India Forward Bloc
|19,174
|0.09%
|
|-

| style="text-align:left;" |Bharatiya National Janata Dal
|12,463
|0.06%
|
|-
|colspan=7 bgcolor=""|
|-
|rowspan=6 bgcolor=""|
!rowspan=6|NDA

! style="text-align:left;" |National Democratic Alliance
!3,164,454
!15.02%
!1.74%
|-

| style="text-align:left;" |Bharatiya Janata Party
|3,118,249
|14.80%
| 
|-

| style="text-align:left;" |Bharath Dharma Jana Sena
|26,336
|0.13%
|0.13% 
|-

| style="text-align:left;" |Kerala Kamaraj Congress
|14,358
|0.07%
|
|-

| style="text-align:left;" |Kerala Congress (Thomas)
|4,975
|0.02%
|
|-

| style="text-align:left;" |Lok Janshakti Party
|536
|0.00%
|
|-
|colspan=7 bgcolor=""|
|-
|rowspan=10 bgcolor=""|
!rowspan=10|Others

| style="text-align:left;" |Social Democratic Party of India
|132,423
|0.63%
|
|-

| style="text-align:left;" |Twenty 20
|41,845
|0.20%
|
|-

| style="text-align:left;" |Bahujan Samaj Party
|36,284
|0.17%
|
|-

| style="text-align:left;" |Welfare Party of India
|32,630
|0.15%
|
|-

| style="text-align:left;" |Kerala Janapaksham (Secular)
|27,995
|0.13%
|
|-

| style="text-align:left;" |Peoples Democratic Party
|26,223
|0.12%
|
|-

| style="text-align:left;" |Revolutionary Marxist Party of India
|24,899
|0.12%
|
|-

| style="text-align:left;" |Aam Aadmi Party
|10,539
|0.05%
|
|-

| style="text-align:left;" |Janathipathiya Samrakshana Samithy
|2,140
|0.01%
|
|-

| style="text-align:left;" |Marxist-Leninist Party of India (Red Flag)
|2,055
|0.01%
|
|-
|colspan=7 bgcolor=""|
|-
|rowspan=2 bgcolor=""|
!rowspan=2|IND
|-

| style="text-align:left;" |Independents
|1,206,878
|5.73%
|
|-
! colspan=7 |
|- class="unsortable" style="background-color:#E9E9E9"
! colspan = 4|Total
! 21,068,782  !! style="text-align:center;" |100.00%
! 
|}

Local body wise

Ward-wise

Aftermath

Result analysis 
All of the three major pre-poll alliances, LDF, UDF, and NDA, improved their vote share compared to that in the previous election. The result showed popular support in favour of LDF led government, led by Pinarayi Vijayan. Jose K. Mani faction of Kerala Congress (M), which left UDF to join LDF, performed well in traditional UDF strongholds in Kottayam, Pathanamthitta and Idukki districts. However UDF improved its position in the districts of Ernakulam and Malappuram. Even though LDF lost majority in some of the Grama Panchayaths and Municipalities, they managed to gain absolute majority in Thiruvananthapuram corporation, became the largest alliance in Kochi corporation, and also won several more Block Panchayaths and District Panchayaths than in the previous election.

Reactions 
Chief Minister Pinarayi Vijayan hailed his alliance's victory as that of secularism and inclusive development, while remarking that the results were a befitting reply to UDF and BJP. Leader of the Opposition Ramesh Chennithala said that UDF voter base was intact highlighting that they had won more municipalities while mentioning he would introspect about their poor performance in Thiruvananthapuram corporation. BJP national president J. P. Nadda and state president K. Surendran thanked the voters for providing an improved mandate to their party in the election

TREND software error 
The final results of a few panchayats and municipalities were changed due to error in the TREND software as per the State Election Commission. This meant that the lead UDF had over LDF in municipalities was cut from 10 municipalities to 4. The Election Commission published the results in its official website after rectifying the error.

Post-election incidents 
LDF won control in 43 municipalities, UDF in 41 and BJP in 2 municipalities. In Kalamassery municipality, UDF won control of the municipality by drawing lots, as both they and LDF had equal backing in the administrative council. LDF also controls 11 district panchayats, while UDF got the remaining 3. The latter assumed control of Wayanad district panchayat through drawing lots.

21 year old Arya Rajendran became the mayor of Thiruvananthapuram corporation, thereby becoming the youngest ever mayor of a municipal corporation in India.

Reshma Mariam Roy, who was the youngest candidate in the elections, became the youngest ever president of a panchayat in Kerala at 21 years old after being elected as the president of Aruvappulam Grama panchayat in Pathanamthitta. She had filed her nomination on November 18, days before she turned 21.

See also 

 Elections in Kerala
 2015 Kerala local body elections
 2016 Kerala Legislative Assembly election
 2021 Kerala Legislative Assembly election
 2020 Paravur Municipal election

Footnotes

References

External links
http://www.trend.kerala.gov.in/views/index.php 

2020 elections in India
Local elections in Kerala